Edwin van Calker (born 14 June 1979 in Gasselternijveenschemond, Drenthe) is a Dutch bobsledder who has competed since 2001. His best Bobsleigh World Cup finish was third in the two-man event at St. Moritz in January 2010.

Van Calker's best finish at the FIBT World Championships was 14th in the two-man event at St. Moritz in 2007.

At the 2010 Winter Olympics in Vancouver, van Calker finished 14th in the two-man event while withdrawing from the four-man event over safety concerns at the Whistler Sliding Centre.

Prior to his bobsledding career, he competed in sprinting and hurdling events: at the 1995 European Youth Olympic Days he was fourth in the 110 metres hurdles and a bronze medallist in the 4×100 metres relay.

References

External links
 
 
 "Ivo Danilevic coaches Netherland’s bob team of Edwin van Calker". International Bobsleigh & Skeleton Federation. 2011-11-11.
 

1979 births
Living people
Dutch male bobsledders
Dutch male hurdlers
Dutch male sprinters
Bobsledders at the 2010 Winter Olympics
Bobsledders at the 2014 Winter Olympics
Olympic bobsledders of the Netherlands
People from Aa en Hunze
Sportspeople from Drenthe